Grant Llewellyn (born 29 December 1960) is a Welsh conductor and music director of the North Carolina Symphony and Orchestre National de Bretagne.

Biography 
Llewellyn was born in Tenby, Pembrokeshire, Wales. He began developing his conducting reputation in 1985, when he was awarded a conducting fellow position at the Tanglewood Music Center in Massachusetts. There his mentors included Leonard Bernstein, Seiji Ozawa, Kurt Masur and André Previn. He later conducted concerts at the Tanglewood Festival with the Boston Pops and as assistant conductor of the Boston Symphony Orchestra.  From 1990 to 1995, he was associate conductor of the BBC National Orchestra of Wales.  He was principal guest conductor of the Stavanger Symfoniorkester from 1993 to 1996.  Llewellyn served as chief conductor of the Royal Philharmonic Orchestra of Flanders (now known as the Antwerp Symphony Orchestra) from 1995 to 1998.

From 2001 to 2006, Llewellyn was the music director of the Handel and Haydn Society (Boston), where he also held the title of principal conductor.  Since July 2004, he has been Music Director of the North Carolina Symphony. In September 2013, his contract was extended to the 2019/20 season. He has been Music Direcor of the Orchestre Symphonique de Bretagne since 2014.

Also a conductor of opera, Llewellyn has led performances at the English National Opera (Die Zauberflöte) and the Opera Theatre of Saint Louis. He developed an association with stage director Chen-Shi Zheng with a 2001 production of Henry Purcell's Dido and Aeneas at the Spoleto Festival USA. He also conducted a 2003 new production of Jules Massenet’s Manon at Opera North. More recently he conducted at the BBC Cardiff Singer of the World competition.

Grant Llewellyn is UK President of the Welsh Sinfonia, Wales' professional chamber orchestra, conducted by Mark Eager.

Llewellyn, his wife Charlotte and their four children reside in Cardiff.

References

Sources

External links
 Leeds Conductor's Competition 2002 page

1960 births
British performers of early music
Living people
Welsh conductors (music)
British male conductors (music)
People from Tenby
Prize-winners of the Leeds Conductors Competition
21st-century British conductors (music)
21st-century British male musicians